The mayor of Winnipeg is a member of Winnipeg City Council, but does not represent a ward.
The position of mayor was created in 1873 following the incorporation of Winnipeg. Since 1998, the term of office has been for four years.

The 44th and current mayor of Winnipeg is Scott Gillingham, elected on October 26, 2022.

History
The position of mayor was created in 1873 following the incorporation of Winnipeg (renamed from Fort Garry), now the provincial capital of Manitoba. From 1874 to 1955, the mayor of Winnipeg was elected for one year only; then, from 1955 until 1972, the term of office was extended to two years.

The election of the first City Council was held on 6 October 1971 and the new City of Winnipeg was amalgamated on 1 January 1972. Thereafter, the new Council consisted of 50 councillors—elected from each of Winnipeg's wards—and 1 mayor, who is elected by the city as a whole. From 1972 onward, the mayor held office for a term of three years. Finally, in 1998, the term of office was extended to four years.

List of mayors

19th century
 1874          Francis Evans Cornish, Q. C.
 1875–76 William Nassau Kennedy
 1877–78 Thomas Scott
 1879–80 Alexander Logan
 1881      Elias George Conklin
 1882      Braeden Barnabe
 1883      Benjamin Dusik
 1884      Josh Richards
 1885      Charles Edward Hamilton
 1886      Henry Shaver Wesbrook
 1887–88 Lyman Melvin Jones
 1889      Thomas Ryan
 1890–91 Alfred Pearson
 1892      Alexander Macdonald
 1893–94 Thomas William Taylor
 1895      Thomas Gilroy
 1896      Richard Willis Jameson
 1897      William F. McCreary
 1898–99 A.J. Andrews

20th century
 1900      Horace Wilson
 1901–03 John Arbuthnot
 1904–06 Thomas Sharpe
 1907–08 James Henry Ashdown
 1909–11 William Sanford Evans
 1912      Richard Deans Waugh
 1913–14 Thomas Russ Deacon
 1915–16 Richard Deans Waugh
 1917      David J. Dyson
 Unseated on recount, January 5, 1917
 1917      Frederick Harvey Davidson
 Declared elected on recount, January 8, 1917
 1918      Frederick Harvey Davidson
 1919–20 Charles Frederick Gray
 1921      Edward Parnell
 1922      Edward Parnell
 Died June 9, 1922
 1922      Frank Oliver Fowler
 Elected June 20, 1922
 1923–24 Seymour Farmer
 1925–27 Lt. Col. Ralph Webb, D.S.O., M.C.
 1928–29 Lt. Col. Daniel McLean
 1930–34 Lt. Col. Ralph Webb, D.S.O., M.C.
 1935–36 John Queen, M. L. A.
 1937      Frederick Edgar Warriner, D. D. S.
 1938–40 John Queen, M. L. A.
 1941–42 John Queen
 1943–54 Garnet Coulter, Q. C.
 1955–56 George Edward Sharpe
 1957–59 Stephen Juba, M. L. A.
 1960–77 Stephen Juba, OC
 1977–79 Robert Steen, Q. C.
 Died May 10, 1979
 1979–92 William Norrie, Q. C.
 Elected June 21, 1979
 1992–98 Susan Ann Thompson
 1998–2000    Glen Murray

21st century
 2000–2004 Glen Murray
 Resigned May 11, 2004
 2004–2014 Sam Katz
 2014–2022 Brian Bowman
 2022–present Scott Gillingham

References

External links 
 Mayors of Winnipeg - Manitoba Historical Society
 History: Mayors, Past and Present - Winnipeg.ca (copy archived in 2008)

Winnipeg, Manitoba
List
Mayors of Winnipeg